San Nicolás is a municipality in the Estelí department of Nicaragua.

Municipalities of the Estelí Department